Boettger's dwarf gecko (Lygodactylus heterurus) is a species of gecko endemic to Madagascar.

References

Lygodactylus
Reptiles of Madagascar
Endemic fauna of Madagascar
Reptiles described in 1913
Taxa named by Oskar Boettger